VF-43 was a Fighter Squadron of the U.S. Navy. The squadron was originally established as Fighter Squadron 74A (VF-74A) on 1 May 1945, it was redesignated Fighter Squadron 74 (VF-74) on 1 August 1945, redesignated VF-1B on 15 November 1946, redesignated VF-21 on 1 September 1948, redesignated as Attack Squadron 43 (VA-43) Challengers on 1 July 1959 and Fighter Squadron 43 (VF-43) on 1 June 1973. It was disestablished on 1 July 1994.

Operational history

VF-1B was assigned to Carrier Air Group One (CVBG-1), aboard  and was embarked on Midway's first deployment from 29 October 1947 to 11 March 1948 to the Mediterranean.

VF-21 was assigned to Carrier Air Group Six (CVG-6) and deployed to the Mediterranean aboard USS Midway from 9 January to 5 May 1952.

VF-21 was assigned to Air Task Group 181 (ATG-181) aboard  from 24 January to 31 March 1956 during her shakedown cruise in the Atlantic, and aboard  for a Western Pacific deployment from 15 October 1956 to 22 May 1957.

This would be VF-21's last deployment.

On 1 July 1959 VF-21 was redesignated as Attack Squadron 43 (VA-43) and became a fleet replacement squadron for the F-11 Tiger and later the A-4 Skyhawk.  The squadron subsequently adopted the moniker of the "Challengers" in 1961.

In June 1973, the squadron was redesignated as Fighter Squadron FORTY-THREE (VF-43) and was assigned as an Atlantic Fleet adversary squadron at NAS Oceana, Virginia in support of training Atlantic Fleet fighter squadrons collocated at NAS Oceana.  In this role, the squadron would fly the A-4F/J and TA-4F/J Skyhawk II, the T-38A Talon, the F-16N Fighting Falcon, and the F-21A Kfir, the latter being an Israeli-built modification of the Dassault Mirage 5.  The squadron also conducted instrument proficiency training and spin training in the T-2C Buckeye. Following the end of the Cold War and subsequent reductions in the U.S. defense budget, VF-43 was identified for disestablishment.  Following VF-43's inactivation in July 1994, its mission was assumed by strike fighter and fighter composite squadrons in the Naval Air Reserve.  At NAS Oceana, this mission is primarily accomplished by Fighter Composite Squadron 12 (VFC-12).

Home port assignments
The squadron was assigned to these home ports:
NAS Oceana

Aircraft assignment
F4U-5 Corsair
F8F Bearcat
F-9F8 Cougar
FJ-3 Fury
F-11 Tiger
T-2 Buckeye
A-4F Skyhawk
T-38 Talon
F-21A Kfir - 1985-88
F-16N Viper - 1987-1994

See also
 List of inactive United States Navy aircraft squadrons
 History of the United States Navy

References

External links

Aircraft squadrons of the United States Navy